The Association for Environment Conscious Building (AECB) is the leading network for sustainable building professionals in the United Kingdom. Membership of the AECB includes local authorities, housing associations, builders, architects, designers, consultants and manufacturers. The association was founded in 1989 to increase awareness within the construction industry of the need to respect, protect, preserve and enhance the environment and to develop, share and promote best practice in environmentally sustainable building.

Less is More
On 30 January 2012 the AECB released its report Less is More: Energy Security after Oil which was published at the end of an unprecedented fifteen years in UK energy policy history.  It began with the formal acceptance of the need for a climate change policy by the last Conservative Government in 1997 and culminated with the Climate Change Act 2008 and the 4th Carbon Budget.  Less is More is a significant new contribution to the debate and offers an alternative to the emerging orthodoxy of large-scale electrification of heat and road transport as a way to achieve or beat the UK's 2050 CO2 emissions target. This is based on more vigorous and systematic pursuit of energy efficiency throughout the economy; on technologies such as large-scale solar heat, piped to urban buildings; a road and air transport system synthesising liquid fuels in part from renewable electricity, supplementing the biofuel resource; a small electricity supply system, supplied largely by despatchable sources, assisting with network security; and the more vigorous pursuit of carbon dioxide (CO2) sequestration options, particularly in the biosphere.

Less is More contends that an electric future is more costly and could be slower to deliver significant CO2 reductions than the alternatives. Vigorous pursuit of energy efficiency, plus biosequestration, plus more focus on UK energy uses and the characteristics of energy systems, sets the stage for significantly cheaper and more secure energy supply options. Less-electric futures appear to have the capacity to deliver CO2 reductions both more cheaply and more quickly than more-electric. Cumulative emissions to 2050 are at least as important as emissions in the year 2050.
The report highlights key areas for technology, product and supply chain development. They include piped heat, which is a mature technology in several of Britain's continental neighbours, and heats over 60% of Danish buildings, but remains uncommon in the UK. They include high-performance insulation systems that could significantly reduce losses in heat storage and distribution systems at all scales, along with renewable fuel production. Heat networks play a systematic role in the scenario, opening up access to large-scale solar, geothermal and waste heat resources at lower costs than new electricity sources and reducing the risk that the UK will be unable to keep the lights on.

Less is More contains a critique of the dysfunctionality of UK energy markets. The authors note that water is supplied by vertically-integrated and regulated local monopolies, which have access to capital at near-public sector interest rates, especially if they are debt-funded. They pose the question of why such arrangements cannot be used again in the energy sector, paralleling as it happens the situation with some private US utilities and with utilities in Denmark. The report does not offer the prospect of an easy path to energy independence and decarbonisation. It makes it very clear that all options pose acute difficulties. But it warns policy-makers not to reject technologies just because they appear difficult without making sober comparisons with the reality of the other technologies under consideration.

AECB Silver Certification
AECB Silver Certification is a self-certification scheme open to building projects that meet the AECB Silver Standard design and performance criteria. The AECB self-certification route has been developed whereby the self certifier (typically the building's energy consultant) takes responsibility for certification and for underwriting the Silver Standard claim.
AECB Silver compliance cannot be assumed unless the building has been modelled in PHPP (passivhaus planning software) and construction quality has been verified.

The AECB self-certification process is designed to make explicit the project's claim to be a low energy design and to provide the consumer with a degree of protection under trading standards - without the AECB having to get involved in quality control and legal matters. This approach puts the responsibility for performance claims clearly with the person signing the certificate and a duty of care on the client to ensure that the consultant is competent and suitably insured.

Low-carbon building
While the AECB recognises that all aspects of sustainability are important, it believes that climate change threatens to overwhelm its members' achievements in other areas. It is therefore currently focusing on trying to help reduce carbon emissions related to domestic and non-domestic buildings in the UK (around 50% of UK CO emissions – excluding flying – relate to buildings). The association believes that the Government's target of a 60% reduction in CO emissions by 2050 is too little, too late, and that a reduction of at least 85% is required to meet the challenges of climate change.

Low-carbon standards
To promote low-carbon building, the association has developed two advanced energy standards and adopted a third, in order to provide three steps to low energy and low carbon buildings achievable by the UK over the next 40 years. These standards are largely based on the methodology and principles underlying the German Passivhaus movement, developed by the Passivhaus Institut, and are also informed by American, Canadian, Scandinavian and European energy standards and various successful energy efficient building programmes. The standards themselves lie at the centre of a developing education and training programme which the AECB has called the 'Carbon Literate Design and Construction Programme' (CLP).

The 'Step One' standard  (Silver) is close to the Canadian R-2000, the German Low Energy House (Niedrigenergiehaus), and the Swiss MINERGIE Standard.

The AECB has aimed this Standard at those wishing to create high-performance buildings using widely available technology at little or no extra cost. It estimates that, what is states is a low-risk option, will reduce overall CO₂ emissions by 70% compared with the UK average for buildings of each type – a result it feels is highly significant given the relative ease and low cost with which this standard could be met.

Step Two, the Passivhaus (or Passive house) Standard takes full advantage of existing energy-efficient technology without entailing the perceived risk associated with radical innovation. A considerable improvement on normal UK building practices, the AECB estimates that the Passivhaus standard would reduce overall CO₂ emissions by approximately 80% compared with the UK average for buildings of each type.

The AECB estimates that Step Three, the Gold Standard, would reduce overall CO₂ emissions by 95% compared with the UK average for buildings of each type, since this standard is almost identical to the Passivhaus Standard in terms of thermal efficiency but sets even lower limits on CO₂ emissions and overall primary energy use. As well as a requirement for energy-efficient electrical appliances, this standard demands a greater emphasis on electricity-producing renewables to offset power used for lighting, appliances and ventilation.

The AECB, believing that rigorous alternative approaches based on successful overseas' experience for sustainable design and construction have a complementary place alongside UK government initiatives,  has been lobbying for the Government's Code for Sustainable Homes to be aligned with its CLP, or at least for the CLP (despite its methodological and base-line measuring differences) to be treated as an alternative official route for effectively designing and delivering low energy and low carbon buildings. The AECB has taken the stance of inviting the design and construction industry to judge for itself, based on actual real world performance of the resulting buildings, which low carbon design codes and programmes best deliver genuinely low energy and low carbon performance cost effectively.

Low Energy Buildings Database
A guiding principle of the AECB is to focus on what really works in practice, to deliver buildings with genuinely improved environmental performance. The AECB established the AECB/CarbonLite Buildings Performance Database with the support of the Technology Strategy Board to show people what could actually be achieved in reality, as opposed to what people hoped they might achieve when developing the design.  The database draws on the collective experience of AECB members, and now also the team’s involved in the Retrofit for the Future projects, and shares that learning. Almost uniquely, this database gives an honest account to anyone planning a low energy building of what can be achieved, along with a detailed account of how it has been done.

The database includes information on both refurbishment and new build projects, in both the domestic and non-domestic sectors. The database shows the performance of each building, in both figures and clearly presented graphs. Design intention can easily be compared with built reality, and projects can easily be compared with each other. For each project you can see detailed design strategies, descriptions and illustrations of the building type, the measures taken and technologies employed. As the monitoring figures accumulate, the database will offer increasing numbers of well-illustrated and robust benchmarks for the energy and carbon performance levels that can be achieved, across a wide range of building types.

See also

Code for Sustainable Homes
Energy efficiency in British housing
Good Homes Alliance
Low-energy building
National House Building Council
Sustainability
UK Green Building Council

References

External links
AECB website
UK Passivhaus Trust website
 Less is More, energy security after Oil 

Sustainability organizations
Environmental organisations based in the United Kingdom
Housing in the United Kingdom
Low-energy building in the United Kingdom
Environmental organizations established in 1989
1989 establishments in the United Kingdom